Mother M. Pauline O'Neill, C.S.C. (1854–1935), was the first president of Saint Mary's College in Notre Dame, Indiana.

In 1908, the charter for Saint Mary’s Academy was amended to authorize the legal existence of a college, and Mother Pauline, then Director, became the College’s first President. Known as the “builder for God” because of the unprecedented growth during her tenure, Mother Pauline’s most notable accomplishment – Le Mans Hall – still stands as the most recognizable symbol of Saint Mary's. Her tenure was from 1895-1931.

References

1854 births
1935 deaths
19th-century American Roman Catholic nuns
Heads of universities and colleges in the United States
Congregation of Holy Cross
Women heads of universities and colleges
Saint Mary's College (Indiana) alumni
Saint Mary's College (Indiana) faculty
American women academics
20th-century American Roman Catholic nuns